Paddy Kelly (born 1955) is an Irish former hurler who played as a left wing-forward at senior level for the Limerick county team.

Kelly made his first appearance for the team during the 1974 championship and quickly became a regular player until his retirement at the end of the 1987 championship. During that time he won two Munster winners' medals, two National League winner's medals and an All-Star award.

At club level Kelly is a double Munster medalist with Kilmallock. In addition to this he has also won six county championship winners' medals during a club career that spanned three decades.

References

 

1955 births
Living people
All Stars Awards winners (hurling)
Kilmallock hurlers
Limerick inter-county hurlers
Munster inter-provincial hurlers